Sociedade Esportiva Palmeiras is a Brazilian professional football club based in São Paulo, Brazil. The club was formed in 1914. 

Palmeiras has won 16 national competitions, which makes it the most successful club inside Brazil. The club's most important titles are 1 Intercontinental World Club Tournament (Copa Rio), 3 Copa Libertadores, 11 Brazilian National Leagues (Campeonato Brasileiro Série A), 4 Brazil Cups (Copa do Brasil), 1 Champions Cup (Copa dos Campeões), 1 (Recopa Sudamericana) and 1 South American Cup (Copa Mercosul), as well as 5 Interstate titles (Torneio Rio – São Paulo), 24 State Championship titles (Campeonato Paulista) and 3 Ramón de Carranza Trophy titles.

Seasons

Campeonato Paulista positions – 1902-present

Cammpeonato Paulista Extra positions – 1926-1938

Supercampeonato Paulista position – 2002

Torneio Rio-São Paulo positions – 1933-2002

Torneio Quinela de Ouro position – 1942

Torneio Rio-São Paulo (Início) position – 1951

Torneio João Havelange position – 1993

Campeonato Brasileiro Série A positions – 1959-present

Campeonato Brasileiro Série B positions – 1971-present

Copa do Brasil positions – 1989-present

Supercopa do Brasil positions – 1990-present

Copa dos Campeões positions – 2000-2002

Copa Libertadores positions – 1960-present

Copa Mercosur/Copa Sudamericana positions – 1998-present

Recopa Sudamericana positions – 1989-present

Copa Rio/Intercontinental Cup/FIFA Club World Cup positions – 1951-present

2003–Present (Current national league format)
{|class="wikitable"
|-  style="background:#008000; text-align:center;"
|Season
|Div.
|Pos.
|Pl.
|W
|D
|L
|GS
|GA
|P
|Campeonato Paulista
|Copa do Brasil
|Supercopa do Brasil
|colspan=2|CONMEBOL
|FIFA Club World Cup
|Top scorer (League)
|Goals
|Head coach
|-
|align=center|2003
|align=center rowspan="1"|Série B
|align=center bgcolor="gold"|1
|align=center|23
|align=center|13
|align=center|8
|align=center|2
|align=center|54
|align=center|25
|align=center|47
|align=center|Semi-finals
|align=center|Round of 16
|align=center|–
|align=center|–
|align=center|–
|align=center|–
|align=left| Vágner Love
|align=center|19
|align=left| Jair Picerni 
|-
|align=center|2004
|align=center rowspan="1"|Série A
|align=center bgcolor="green1"|4
|align=center|46
|align=center|22
|align=center|13
|align=center|11
|align=center|72
|align=center|47
|align=center|79
|align=center|Semi-finals
|align=center|Quarter-finals
|align=center|–
|align=center|–
|align=center|–
|align=center|–
|align=left| Osmar
|align=center|11
|align=left| Jair Picerni   Wilson Macarrão   Estevam Soares 
|-
|align=center|2005
|align=center rowspan="1"|Série A
|align=center bgcolor="green1"|4
|align=center|42
|align=center|20
|align=center|10
|align=center|12
|align=center|81
|align=center|65
|align=center|70
|align=center|9th
|align=center|–
|align=center|–
|align=center|CL
|align=center|Round of 16
|align=center|–
|align=left| Marcinho
|align=center|18
|align=left| Paulo Bonamigo   Candinho   Wilson Macarrão  Emerson Leão
|-
|align=center|2006
|align=center rowspan="1"|Série A
|align=center|16
|align=center|38
|align=center|12
|align=center|8
|align=center|18
|align=center|58
|align=center|70
|align=center|44
|align=center|3rd
|align=center|–
|align=center|–
|align=center|–
|align=center|–
|align=center|
|align=left| Edmundo   Paulo Baier
|align=center|10
|align=left| Emerson Leão   Marcelo Vilar   Tite   Jair Picerni
|-
|align=center|2007
|align=center rowspan="1"|Série A
|align=center bgcolor="blue"|7
|align=center|38
|align=center|16
|align=center|10
|align=center|12
|align=center|48
|align=center|47
|align=center|58
|align=center|5th
|align=center|Second Round
|align=center|–
|align=center|–
|align=center|–
|align=center|–
|align=left| Caio
|align=center|9
|align=left| Caio Júnior
|-
|align=center|2008
|align=center rowspan="1"|Série A
|align=center bgcolor="green1"|4
|align=center|38
|align=center|19
|align=center|8
|align=center|11
|align=center|55
|align=center|45
|align=center|65
|align=center bgcolor="gold"|Champion
|align=center|Round of 16
|align=center|–
|align=center|CS
|align=center|Quarter-finals
|align=center|–
|align=left| Alex Mineiro
|align=center|18
|align=left| Nei Pandolfo   Vanderlei Luxemburgo
|-
|align=center|2009
|align=center rowspan="1"|Série A
|align=center bgcolor="blue"|5
|align=center|38
|align=center|17
|align=center|11
|align=center|10
|align=center|58
|align=center|45
|align=center|62
|align=center|Semi-Finals
|align=center|–
|align=center|–
|align=center|CL
|align=center|Quarter-finals
|align=center|–
|align=left| Obina
|align=center|12
|align=left| Vanderlei Luxemburgo   Jorginho   Muricy Ramalho
|-
|align=center|2010
|align=center rowspan="1"|Série A
|align=center bgcolor="blue"|10
|align=center|38
|align=center|12
|align=center|14
|align=center|12
|align=center|42
|align=center|43
|align=center|50
|align=center|11th
|align=center|Quarter-finals
|align=center|–
|align=center|CS
|align=center|Semi-finals
|align=center|–
|align=left| Kléber
|align=center|8
|align=left| Antônio Carlos Zago   Parraga   Luiz Felipe Scolari
|-
|align=center|2011
|align=center rowspan="1"|Série A
|align=center bgcolor="blue"|11
|align=center|38
|align=center|11
|align=center|17
|align=center|10
|align=center|43
|align=center|39
|align=center|50
|align=center|Semi-finals
|align=center|Quarter-finals
|align=center|–
|align=center|CS
|align=center|Second Round
|align=center|–
|align=left| Luan
|align=center|9
|align=left| Luiz Felipe Scolari
|-
|align=center|2012
|align=center rowspan="1"|Série A
|align=center style="background-color:#FCC"|18
|align=center|38
|align=center|9
|align=center|7
|align=center|22
|align=center|39
|align=center|54
|align=center|34
|align=center|Quarter-finals
|align=center bgcolor="gold"|Champion
|align=center|–
|align=center|CS
|align=center|Round of 16
|align=center|–
|align=left| Hernán Barcos
|align=center|14
|align=left| Luiz Felipe Scolari   Narciso   Gilson Kleina

|-
|align=center|2013
|align=center rowspan="1"|Série B
|align=center bgcolor="gold"|1
|align=center|38
|align=center|24
|align=center|7
|align=center|7
|align=center|71
|align=center|28
|align=center|79
|align=center|Quarter-finals
|align=center|Round of 16
|align=center|–
|align=center|CL
|align=center|Round of 16
|align=center|–
|align=left| Alan Kardec
|align=center|14
|align=left| Gilson Kleina

|-
|align=center|2014
|align=center rowspan="1"|Série A
|align=center|16
|align=center|38
|align=center|11
|align=center|7
|align=center|20
|align=center|34
|align=center|59
|align=center|40
|align=center|Semi-finals
|align=center|Round of 16
|align=center|–
|align=center|–
|align=center|–
|align=center|–
|align=left| Henrique Dourado
|align=center|16
|align=left| Gilson Kleina   Alberto Valentim   Ricardo Gareca   Alberto Valentim   Dorival Júnior 

|-
|align=center|2015
|align=center rowspan="1"|Série A
|align=center bgcolor="green1"|9
|align=center|38
|align=center|15
|align=center|8
|align=center|15
|align=center|60
|align=center|51
|align=center|53
|align=center|Runner-up
|align=center bgcolor="gold"|Champion
|align=center|–
|align=center|–
|align=center|–
|align=center|–
|align=left| Dudu
|align=center|10
|align=left| Oswaldo de Oliveira   Alberto Valentim   Marcelo Oliveira 

|-
|align=center|2016
|align=center rowspan="1"|Série A
|align=center bgcolor="gold"|1
|align=center|38
|align=center|24
|align=center|8
|align=center|6
|align=center|62
|align=center|32
|align=center|80
|align=center|Semi-finals
|align=center|Quarter-finals
|align=center|–
|align=center|CL
|align=center|Group Stage
|align=center|–
|align=left| Gabriel Jesus
|align=center|12
|align=left| Marcelo Oliveira   Alberto Valentim   Cuca

|-
|align=center|2017
|align=center|Série A
|align=center bgcolor="silver"|2
|align=center|38
|align=center|19
|align=center|6
|align=center|13
|align=center|61
|align=center|45
|align=center|63
|align=center|Semi-finals
|align=center|Quarter-finals
|align=center|–
|align=center|CL
|align=center|Round of 16
|align=center|–
|align=left| Dudu
|align=center|9
|align=left| Eduardo Baptista   Cuca   Alberto Valentim

|-
|align=center|2018
|align=center rowspan="1"|Série A
|align=center bgcolor="gold"|1
|align=center|38
|align=center|23
|align=center|11
|align=center|4
|align=center|64
|align=center|26
|align=center|80
|align=center|Runner-up
|align=center|Semi-finals
|align=center|–
|align=center|CL
|align=center|Semi-finals
|align=center|–
|align=left| William
|align=center|10
|align=left| Roger Machado   Paulo Turra   Luiz Felipe Scolari

|-
|align=center|2019
|align=center rowspan="1"|Série A
|align=center bgcolor="green1"|3
|align=center|38
|align=center|21
|align=center|11
|align=center|6
|align=center|61
|align=center|32
|align=center|74
|align=center|Semi-finals
|align=center|Quarter-finals
|align=center|–
|align=center|CL
|align=center|Quarter-finals
|align=center|–
|align=left| Bruno Henrique
|align=center|10
|align=left| Luiz Felipe Scolari   Mano Menezes   Andrey Lopes

|-
|align=center|2020
|align=center rowspan="1"|Série A
|align=center bgcolor="green1"|7
|align=center|38
|align=center|15
|align=center|13
|align=center|10
|align=center|51
|align=center|37
|align=center|58
|align=center bgcolor="gold"|Champion
|align=center bgcolor="gold"|Champion
|align=center|–
|align=center|CL
|align=center bgcolor="gold"|Champion
|align=center|4th
|align=left| Raphael Veiga
|align=center|11
|align=left| Vanderlei Luxemburgo   Andrey Lopes   Abel Ferreira

|-
|align=center|2021
|align=center rowspan="1"|Série A
|align=center bgcolor="green1"|3
|align=center|38
|align=center|20
|align=center|6
|align=center|12
|align=center|58
|align=center|43
|align=center|66
|align=center|Runner-up
|align=center|Third round
|align=center|Runner-up
|align=center|CLRS
|Champion
|align=center|Runner-up
|align=left| Raphael Veiga
|align=center|10
|align=left| Abel Ferreira

|-
|align=center|2022
|align=center rowspan="1"|Série A
|align=center bgcolor="gold"|1
|align=center|38
|align=center|23
|align=center|12
|align=center|3
|align=center|66
|align=center|27
|align=center|81
|align=center bgcolor="gold"|Champion
|align=center|Round of 16
|align=center|–
|align=center|CLRS
|Semi-finalsChampion
|align=center|–
|align=left|   Rony
|align=center|12
|align=left| Abel Ferreira

|-
|align=center|2023
|align=center rowspan="1"|Série A
|align=center|TBD
|align=center|0
|align=center|0
|align=center|0
|align=center|0
|align=center|0
|align=center|0
|align=center|0
|align=center|Finals
|align=center|Third round
|align=center bgcolor="gold"|Champion
|align=center|CL
|align=center|Group stage
|align=center|–
|align=left|  
|align=center|
|align=left| Abel Ferreira
|}

All-time statistics

Campeonato Paulista 
Last updated: March 19, 2023

Campeonato Paulista Extra

Supercampeonato Paulista

Torneio Rio-São Paulo

Torneio João Havelange

Torneio Quinela de Ouro

Torneio Início Rio-São Paulo

Campeonato Brasileiro Série A 
Last updated: November 12, 2022

Campeonato Brasileiro Série B 
Last updated: November 30, 2013

Copa do Brasil 
Last updated: July 14, 2022

Supercopa do Brasil 
Last updated: January 28, 2023

Copa dos Campeões

Copa Libertadores 
Last updated: September 6, 2022

Copa Mercosur/Copa Sudamericana 
Last updated: October 23, 2012

Recopa Sudamericana 
Last updated: March 2, 2022

Copa Rio/Intercontinental Cup/FIFA Club World Cup 
Last updated: February 12, 2022

References

Sociedade Esportiva Palmeiras